Manhunt in the Jungle is a 1958 American adventure film directed by Tom McGowan and written by Sam Mervin and Owen Crump. The film stars Robin Hughes, Luis Álvarez, James Wilson, Jorge Montoro, Natalia Mazuelos and John B. Symmes. The film was released by Warner Bros. on April 11, 1958.

Plot

Cast 
Robin Hughes as Cmdr. George M. Dyott
Luis Álvarez as Aloique
James Wilson as Col. P.H. Fawcett
Jorge Montoro as Carissimo
Natalia Mazuelos as Pedro's Wife
John B. Symmes as John B. Symmes
Richard McCloskey as Dr. Emmett Wilson
Harry Knapp as Portuguese Explorer
Emilio Meiners as Pedro
Enrique González as Bernadino
M. Torres Acho as Juan
Alfonso Santilla as Julio

See also 
The Lost City of Z (2016)

References

External links 
 

1958 films
Warner Bros. films
American adventure drama films
1950s adventure drama films
Films set in South America
1958 drama films
1950s English-language films
1950s American films